Frederick Cornelius Wilson (October 3, 1892 – January 18, 1971) was a Canadian professional ice hockey and football player. He played with the Regina Capitals of the Western Canada Hockey League.  He was also a member of the 1914 Regina Victorias that captured the Allan Cup as senior amateur champions of Canada.

Wilson was inducted into the Saskatchewan Sports Hall of Fame as a football player in 1974, having played for the Regina Rugby Club and Regina Roughriders.

Statistics

Regular season and playoffs

References

External links

1892 births
1971 deaths
Canadian ice hockey centres
Ice hockey people from Ontario
People from Northumberland County, Ontario
Regina Capitals players